Edmond Amran El Maleh (30 March 1917 – 15 November 2010) was a Moroccan Jewish writer of Berber extraction.

Biography
El Maleh was born in Safi, Morocco to a Jewish Berber family. He moved to Paris in 1965, working there as a journalist and a teacher of philosophy.

He only began writing in 1980, at the age of 63, traveling back and forth between France and Morocco. He stated that, in spite of his long stay in France, he had devoted his entire literary life to Morocco. From 1999 until his death he lived in Rabat.

El Maleh was an anti-Zionist and declared that his father had taught him that Zionism had nothing to do with Judaism, and that what Jews were doing to Palestinians was against the principles of the Jewish faith. He remained as a result isolated and ignored by most of the Moroccan Jewish community.
He was buried, according to his wishes, in the Jewish cemetery in Essaouira. He wrote in French.

Works
 Parcours immobile (Maspero, 1983)
 In the words of El Maleh: "Ce livre reflète un désir de plus en plus affirmé d'approfondir mon enracinement dans la culture marocaine, où j'ai tenté non pas de transcrire mais de faire revivre mon expérience de jeune juif marocain ayant lutté contre le colonialisme et ensuite militant au sein du mouvement communiste." (This book reflects a desire to deepen more and more the sense that I'm rooted in the Moroccan culture, where I've tried not to copy but to relive my experience of a young Moroccan Jew who fought against colonialism and as a militant within the communist movement)
 Abner, Abnour (La Pensée sauvage/Le Fennec, 1996).
 Le café bleu. Zrirek (La pensée sauvage, 1999)
 Mille ans, un jour (Le Fennec, 1990 – André Dimanche, 2002 (1986))
 Le Retour d'Abou El Haki (La Pensée sauvage, 1990).
 Jean Genet, Le Captif amoureux et autres essais (La Pensée sauvage/Toubkal, 1988 )
 Aïlen ou la nuit du récit (La Découverte, 1983, réédité par André Dimanche, 2000)
 Parcours immobile (Maspéro, 1980 puis réédité par André Dimanche, 2001) : Roman
 La maIle de Sidi Maâchou (Al Manar 1998) 
 Essaouira Cité heureuse
 Une femme, une mère (éditions Lixus, Tanger 2004)

About his work
Following his first novel, Le parcours immobile (1983), he published seven further novels and a book about the painting of Cherkaoui.

In 1996 he received the Grand Prix du Maroc for his work. The translation of 'Edmond Amran El Maleh, "Le retour d'Abou El Haki" (éditions la Pensée sauvage) by Hassan Bourkia received a special prize from the minister of culture Mohammed Achaari in 2005.

References

Further reading
 Bou'Azza Ben'Achir, Cheminements d'une écriture (1997). 238 pages. 
 Vogl, Mary B., 2003, "It Was and It Was Not So: Edmond Amran El Maleh Remembers Morocco," International Journal of Francophone Studies 6.2, 71–85.
 "Taksiat," short story from the collection Abner Abounour by Edmond Amran El Maleh, reprinted with an English translated by Lucy R. McNair, Contemporary French and Francophone Studies/Sites, April 2007, Vol. 11, Issue 2. In same issue, an interview with Moroccan painter Yamou with reference to El Maleh.

External links
 The Writer Edmond Amran El Maleh: A Moroccan Jew with Arabo-Berber Roots Qantara.de
 El Maleh's political views
 El Maleh decorated by King Mohamed VI
 minorities.org report of The Independent (7 Oct 2005) dubbing El-Maleh the "Moroccan James Joyce"

1917 births
2010 deaths
20th-century Moroccan Jews
Anti-Zionist Jews
Berber writers
Jewish socialists
Jewish writers
Moroccan communists
Moroccan writers
Moroccan writers in French
People from Safi, Morocco
Jewish Moroccan politicians
Arab Jews
Berber Jews
Jewish communists